Wang Yan (born 24 August 1974) is a Chinese former cyclist. She competed at the 1992, 1996 and the 2000 Summer Olympics.

References

External links
 

1974 births
Living people
Chinese female cyclists
Olympic cyclists of China
Cyclists at the 1992 Summer Olympics
Cyclists at the 1996 Summer Olympics
Cyclists at the 2000 Summer Olympics
Place of birth missing (living people)
Asian Games medalists in cycling
Cyclists at the 1994 Asian Games
Cyclists at the 1998 Asian Games
Medalists at the 1998 Asian Games
Asian Games gold medalists for China
20th-century Chinese women